Low Skies is an American rock band from Chicago, Illinois.

History
Low Skies formed in 2000 after a chance meeting between Creps and Salveter. After deciding to record together, they played with a number of local musicians before settling on a permanent lineup. After signing with Flameshovel Records in 2002, the group released its debut full-length, The Bed, in 2003. A five-track EP, I Have Been to Beautiful Places, followed in 2004. Their sophomore LP, All the Love I Could Find, was released in 2006. They are currently on hiatus.

Members
Jason Creps - drums
Christopher Salveter - vocals, guitar
Jacob Ross - guitar
Brandon Ross - bass
Luther Rochester - keyboards

Discography
The Bed (Flameshovel Records, 2003)
I Have Been to Beautiful Places (Flameshovel, 2004)
All the Love I Could Find (Flameshovel, 2006)

References

Indie rock musical groups from Illinois
Musical groups from Chicago
Flameshovel Records artists